Toroslar is a municipality and district governorate in Greater Mersin, Turkey. Mersin is one of 30 metropolitan centers in Turkey with more than one municipality within city borders. Now in Mersin there are four second-level municipalities in addition to Greater Mersin (büyükşehir) municipality. The mayor of Toroslar is Atsız Afşin Yılmaz (member of MHP, elected in 2019)).

Geography 
The sister municipality of Akdeniz lies in the southeast. Müftü River and the sister municipality of Yenişehir lie in the south west. Southern slopes of Toros mountains lie in the north. Mersin intrafaith cemetery is in Toroslar.

History 
Yumuktepe, the ruins of one of the earliest human settlements in Anatolia is in Toroslar. Excavations by John Garstang and Seton Lloyd both of which were directors of the British Institute of Archaeology at Ankara, revealed 23 levels of occupation, the earliest dating from c. 6300 BC. The site however was abandoned during Byzantine Empire period. Modern settlement began in the 19th century. Originally a part of Mersin municipality, the municipality of Toroslar was established in 1993 as a secondary level municipality and the corresponding district governorate was established in 2008.

Population 
According to 2020 figures the population of Toroslar is 310,606 (155,881 male and 154.725 female citizens), which makes it the most populous intracity municipality of Mersin.
Approximately 30% of Mersin citizens live in Toroslar. The majority of residents are blue-collar workers who work at factories or in the fields.

Politics 
Different ethnic groups live together in Toroslar. Among these groups are the Yörüks living in the higher parts of the district, the Alevis who came from all over Turkey, the Kurds who immigrated from the eastern provinces and the Arabs who are native to Mersin. The diversity of ethnicities in the district means that all of the country's major political parties receive more than a certain percentage of votes. While the Yörüks generally support the ultranationalist MHP and the conservative AKP, it is observed that most of them are moving to the Good Party. There is an intense Alevi social democratic population supporting the CHP. The dense Kurdish population ensures that HDP's vote is quite high.

Rural area
There are 32 villages and five towns in the rural area of Toroslar. These are situated to the north of Toroslar.

Sport
Sports venues in the district are the 325-seat multi-sport venue, Mersin District 7 Sports Hall, and new-built Toroslar Bocce Facility, both used during the 2013 Mediterranean Games.

International relations

Toroslar is twinned with:
 Uzgen, Kyrgyzstan

See also 
Mersin
Mersin province
Akdeniz
Mezitli
Yenişehir
Mersin Interfaith Cemetery
Mersin Bus Station

References 

Populated places in Mersin Province
Toroslar District
Districts of Mersin Province